Hyde Park Historic District may refer to:

Hyde Park Historic Districts, in Tampa Florida, listed on the NRHP in Florida
Hyde Park, Boise, Idaho, also called Hyde Park Historic District, in Boise, Idaho, listed on the NRHP in Idaho
Hyde Park-Kenwood Historic District, Chicago, Illinois, listed on the NRHP in South Side Chicago, Illinois
Hyde Park Historic District (Kansas City, Missouri), listed on the NRHP in Jackson County, Missouri
Old Hyde Park East Historic District, Kansas City, Missouri, listed on the NRHP in Jackson County, Missouri
Old Hyde Park West Historic District, Kansas City, Missouri, listed on the NRHP in Jackson County, Missouri
South Hyde Park Historic District, Kansas City, Missouri, listed on the NRHP in Jackson County, Missouri
Hyde Park Historic District (Austin, Texas), NRHP-listed